was a Japanese-American writer and wife of the U.S. scholar and Ambassador to Japan Edwin O. Reischauer.

Early life and education 
Haru Matsukata was born in Tokyo. She was a granddaughter of Matsukata Masayoshi, a prime minister in the Meiji era known for his liberal policies over financial affairs, and silk importer and exporter Ryoichiro Arai. She was also a niece of the successful industrialist and art collector Kōjirō Matsukata. She was a sister of Tané Matsukata, founder of the Matsukata Academy, later renamed the Nishimachi International School, in Tokyo. Her second cousin was Nobuhiko Ushiba, who served as Japanese Ambassador to the United States from 1970 to 1973. Her sisters were jewelry designer Miye Matsukata, educator Tané Matsukata, Mari Bruck, Naka Rawsthorne, and brother Mako Matsukata.

She attended highschool at the American School in Japan, and in 1937 graduated from Principia College in Illinois.

Career 
Matsukata returned to Japan and was there during World War II, but felt out of place because of her experience in America. She later returned to the US and worked as a journalist, where she meet Edwin O. Reischauer, whom she married in 1956. In 1961 she returned to Japan with her husband when he was appointed US Ambassador to Japan. They lived in Japan until 1966, a period during which she was able to contribute to the reinforcement of US and Japan relations.

Back to the United States, she took an active role as a director of the Japan America Student Conference.

She wrote an autobiography, Samurai and Silk (1986) which is centered of her grandfathers and their successful roles during Japan's Meiji period. The book inspired a PBS American Playhouse docudrama, Long Shadows.

References

Sources
 

Japanese writers
1915 births
1998 deaths
Matsukata family
Writers from Tokyo
Japanese emigrants to the United States
American School in Japan alumni
Principia College alumni
American Christian Scientists
The Christian Science Monitor people